Gonadotropin insensitivity includes:
 Luteinizing hormone insensitivity
 Follicle-stimulating hormone insensitivity

See also
 Gonadotropin-releasing hormone insensitivity

References

Endocrine gonad disorders
Gonadotropin-releasing hormone and gonadotropins
Rare diseases
Syndromes
Intersex variations